Kurje Dam, also called Dhapcheri Dam, is an earthfill dam on local river named Viroli near Dahanu, Thane district in the state of Maharashtra in India.

Specifications

Purpose
 Irrigation
 Water Supply

See also
 Dams in Maharashtra
 List of reservoirs and dams in India

References

Dams in Palghar district
Dams completed in 1967
1967 establishments in Maharashtra